Chaim Navon (Hebrew: חיים נבון ; born June 25, 1973) is an Israeli rabbi, philosopher, writer, and publicist.

Biography 
Chaim Navon was born in Ramat Gan and grew up in Elkana. From 1992-2004, Navon studied at Yeshivat Har Etzion. He received his Semicha (rabbinic ordination) from  Rabbi Aharon Lichtenstein and the Chief Rabbinate of Israel. In 2004, he graduated from the Hebrew University in Jerusalem with a degree in Jewish philosophy. Navon lives in Modi'in, where he led a local congregation.

Pedagogic, rabbinic and media career
Navon teaches Jewish philosophy, bible, Talmud, and Halakha (Jewish law) in at Yeshivat Har Etzion, Midreshet Lindenbaum, the Midrasha of Bar Ilan University and the Nishmat Center for Advanced Torah Study for Women.

Navon is a member of Tzohar, an organization that seeks to bridge the gaps between religious and secular Jews in Israel.

Navon is a frequent lecturer and writes a weekly column for Makor Rishon, which is identified with Israel's Religious Zionist community.

Navon has edited and translated books by Aharon Lichtenstein and Joseph B. Soloveitchik.

Navon hosts the podcast "One Might Think" (Efshar Lakhshov), which deals with religion, conservatism and public policy. His guests on the podcast have included Israeli Supreme Court justice Noam Sohlberg and journalist Sivan Rahav-Meir.

Views and opinions
Navon believes that religious Zionism  no longer has a single, unifying center of gravity and is facing dramatic processes of ideological change. He describes Haredi society as a "victim of its own success. The social and ideological structure that unprecedentedly magnified a small group of several hundred families and created a dizzying success story can no longer maintain tens of thousands of families. The question is how to translate Haredi success into a new communal structure, which will no longer take the form of a closed religious order." Navon is critical of the phenomenon of "political correctness" and seeks an alternative based on Jewish values. He laments the loss of desire to mirror the religious behavior of one’s grandparents, attributing it to an absence of religious self–confidence. He critiques both liberals trying to change religious practice and reactionaries seeking greater stringency.

Published works 
Navon is the author of 3 novels and 12 non-fiction books Jewish religious thought.

"The Good Fence: Meaning of Halacha Nowadays", Yedioth Sfarim, 2011, Tel Aviv
"Parashot", Maaliyot, 2005, Ma'ale Adumim
"Caught in the Thicket: Introduction to the thought of Rav J.B. Soloveitchik", Maaliyot, 2006, Ma'ale Adumim
"831", Yedioth Books, 2010, Tel Aviv
"A Bridge for Jacob's Daughters: Women in Judaism – Past and Future", Yedioth Books, 2011, Tel Aviv
"Genesis and Jewish Thought", KTAV Publishing House, New Jersey 2008
"Eve Did Not Eat an Apple:101 common mistakes about Judaism", Yedioth Books, 2012, Tel Aviv
"Walking on Fish", Yedioth Books, 2013, Tel Aviv
"Tayku: 101 Great Jewish Controversies", Yedioth Books, 2014, Tel Aviv
"Jewish Laws of Blessings", Yedioth Books, 2015, Tel Aviv
"Homework: Rav Soloveitchik on Partnership, Sexuality and Family Today", Yedioth Books, 2016, Tel Aviv
"Striking Roots: Jewish Criticism on Postmodern Deconstruction", Yedioth Books, 2018, Tel Aviv
"Incorrect: A Jewish Alternative to Political Correctness", Yedioth Books, 2022, Tel Aviv
"Small State to a Great Nation", Yedioth Books, 2021, Tel Aviv
"Freedom Is", Yedioth Books, 2019, Tel Aviv

References

External links 

  Lectures by Chaim Navon, Bet Midrash of Har Etzion  
  Navon: "There is a traditional religious center of gravity and secular people gather around it", March 21, 2021, Yisrael Hayom 
 Chaim Navon on Srugim website
 Chaim Navon on Arutz Sheva website
 Chaim Navon on Channel 14 website
 Chaim Navon, Genesis and Jewish Thought
 Navon's publications on Mida website
 Navon's podcast "Efshar Lakhshov"
 About Chaim Navon on Tikvah Fund's website
 
 
 
 
  

1973 births
Writers on Zionism
Religious Zionist Orthodox rabbis
Israeli Orthodox rabbis
20th-century Israeli rabbis
21st-century Israeli rabbis
Academic staff of Bar-Ilan University
Hebrew University of Jerusalem alumni
Living people
Israeli columnists
Jewish Israeli writers
Israeli settlers
Yeshivat Har Etzion

he:חיים נבון